Krista Kim is a Canadian-Korean contemporary artist whose works frequently use light, digital technology and sound. Kim produced a number of touring installations and displays, along with other works which have been sold as non-fungible tokens (NFTs), some in partnership with major corporations.

Kim completed her undergraduate studies in Political Science at the University of Toronto and went on to receive a masters degree in fine arts at the LASALLE College of the Arts in Singapore in 2014.

Kim refers to the overall concept of her art as Techism and includes techniques and media such as LED lights and gradients to create works.

Kim collaborated with Lanvin on a clothing collection in 2018. In 2021, Kim's project Mars House  was described as the first virtual house sold as an NFT, having sold for more than USD$500,000 in ethereum (ETH) tokens, a bitcoin alternative in the crypto space.  The NFT was designed using video-game software, features music by Jeff Schroeder of The Smashing Pumpkins, and comes with interoperable 3D digital files allowing the owner to integrate the structure into the metaverse platform of their choice.

References

External links
 Krista Kim Studio

Year of birth missing (living people)
Place of birth missing (living people)
Living people
American contemporary artists
American founders